Bani Munabah is a sub-district located in Yarim District, Ibb Governorate, Yemen. Bani Munabah had a population of 23437 as of  2004.

References 

Sub-districts in Yarim District